is a Japanese Olympic show jumping rider.Representing Japan, she competed at two Summer Olympics (in 2012 and 2016). Her best Olympic results came in 2016, when she placed 13th in the team competition and 44th in the individual portion.

Takeda also competed at the 2010 Asian Games in Guangzhou, China.

Reiko Takeda is the daughter of Kunio Takeda, chairman of Takeda pharmaceutical company.

References

Living people
1984 births
Equestrians at the 2012 Summer Olympics
Equestrians at the 2016 Summer Olympics
Equestrians at the 2010 Asian Games
Japanese female equestrians
Olympic equestrians of Japan
Asian Games competitors for Japan
21st-century Japanese women